Arne Tord Sundén (29 June 1909 – 26 August 1999) was a Swedish engineer and yacht designer who drafted the plans for the original Nordic Folkboat but was never credited with the actual design despite a lifetime of legal challenges.

Early life 
Sunden grew up in Gothenburg. He became interested in sailing early on and became a junior member of the Gothenburg Royal Sailing Society. He trained as a ship carpenter at Chalmers University of Technology.

Nordic Folkboat controversy 
In 1941, the Scandinavian Sailing Association organized a design competition for a small cruising sailboat that was cheap, easy to sail, and fun to race. There were 58 entrants, of which six were awarded prizes, but no winner was announced. Swedish sailor and shipping magnate Sven Salén invited Sundén to amalgamate the prize winning designs into one design that became known as the Nordic Folkboat. It seems clear that Sundén drew the lines of the Folkboat, however the committee that commissioned and oversaw the process claimed ownership. Sundén launched numerous lawsuits seeking credit and royalties until his death in 1999.

Further designs 
In addition to the disputed Nordic Folkboat, Sundén designed the International Folkboat (known also as the IF boat) in 1966 for Marieholm Bruk, and in 1976 the Marieholm 26, a refinement of the International Folkboat. There were also further designs for other shipyards including the King's Cruiser 28 for Örnmaskiner.

Career 
Following training at Chalmers University of Technology, Sundén worked as a structural engineer with the Swedish shipbuilding company Eriksbergs Mekaniska Verkstads AB in Gothenburg during the 1940s. In his spare time he designed sailboats, including a R 6a for the shipowner Sven Salén. In the late 1940s he worked for a shipping company as an inspector; this entailed travelling around Europe and overseeing the maintenance of the company’s fleet of ships. Sunden did not design boats during this period but took up design again in the mid-50s. Works from this period included the King’s Cruiser and the IF boat. Following the success of the IF boat, he started his own boat construction company. He was also a partner in a Finnish shipyard.

References 

1909 births
1999 deaths
People from Gothenburg
Swedish yacht designers
Chalmers University of Technology alumni